"Jesus Wants Me for a Sunbeam" is a song originally recorded by the Scottish alternative band the Vaselines. It was later more famously covered by American rock band Nirvana in 1993 who renamed it "Jesus Doesn't Want Me for a Sunbeam".

History

"Jesus Wants Me for a Sunbeam" is a song originally recorded by the Scottish alternative band the Vaselines for their EP Dying for It. It is a parody on the Christian children's hymn "I'll Be a Sunbeam", which has the opening line "Jesus wants me for a sunbeam." The Vaselines re-released the song in 1992 on the compilation albums The Way of The Vaselines: A Complete History, and All the Stuff and More.

The song was little-known outside the indie-pop scene until Seattle grunge band Nirvana recorded the song in November 1993 for their live acoustic album MTV Unplugged in New York, re-titling it "Jesus Doesn't Want Me for a Sunbeam".

Two more versions were released by Nirvana on their 2004 box set With the Lights Out. These were an acoustic version recorded in Portugal in 1994, and a live electric performance on the DVD section of the box set that was recorded at the Paramount Theatre in Seattle on October 31, 1991. This version was re-released in 2011 as a bonus track on the 20th anniversary edition of the Nevermind album and on the Live at the Paramount DVD and Blu-ray.

In the version featured on the MTV Unplugged in New York album, Nirvana frontman Kurt Cobain refers to the song as "a rendition of an old Christian song, I think. But we do it the Vaselines' way." At a Nirvana concert that took place on December 30, 1993, at the Great Western Forum in Inglewood, California, Cobain dedicated the song to the recently deceased River Phoenix.

References

1987 songs
Nirvana (band) songs
The Vaselines songs
Songs about Jesus